Buffalo Lake National Wildlife Refuge is a protected area in Randall County in the Texas Panhandle. Its shortgrass prairies spill into marshes, woodlands, riparian habitat, croplands, and water-carved canyon walls that together form  of homes for migratory and year-round wildlife. The area forms a habitat for black-tailed prairie dogs and burrowing owls, among many other species. Some  of the refuge carries the designation of National Natural Landmark.

Buffalo Lake NWR lies within a canyon carved by Tierra Blanca Creek, an ephemeral stream that stretches across northern portions of the Llano Estacado. The discharge of this stream is highly variable, and it is not unusual for the creek to dry out completely.  At the same time, as the sole creek bed within a large drainage basin in a region prone to frequent and intense thunderstorms, it often suffers the destructive effects of flash floods.  A large flood control structure, called Umbarger Dam, was constructed to impound the waters of Tierra Blanca Creek and form Buffalo Lake within the boundaries of  the wildlife refuge.  The ponded waters of this shallow lake can provide key roosting habitat for migrating birds.

See also
Grulla National Wildlife Refuge
Muleshoe National Wildlife Refuge
Rita Blanca National Grassland
Palo Duro Canyon
Caprock Canyons State Park and Trailway
McKittrick Canyon

References

External links

Official website

National Wildlife Refuges in Texas
Protected areas of Randall County, Texas
Grasslands of Texas
Wetlands of Texas
1958 establishments in Texas
Protected areas established in 1958
National Natural Landmarks in Texas